Coming Out Simulator 2014 is an interactive fiction video game made by Canadian developer Nicky Case. The semi-autobiographical game was released on 1 July 2014 as a submission for the Nar8 Game Jam.

Inspired by real-life events, Coming Out Simulator 2014 is intended to help LGBT youth to understand their sexuality. The game teaches what happens in conversations about coming out. According to Case's writing in the game itself, there are "no right answers."

Gameplay

The player is initially introduced into the game by the creator, and is made aware that they will play the role of a younger Case and be faced with decisions and events that may or may not have happened in their own life. The player must choose a selection of responses to say in conversation with other characters, in a user interface deliberately stylized to look like an instant messaging application. The characters in Coming Out Simulator respond to the choices of the player.

Kotaku reported that Case presented the game as a crossover between The Walking Dead and text messaging, and Case concurs with this description. The game takes fifteen to twenty minutes to complete.

Plot
The player meets Nicky Case, the author of this game, in a Starbucks coding. Case introduces themself and explains that the game they are working on, while it is based on their life experiences, is "100% lies", and will be 100% even if the dialogue were 100% true. The game flashes back to a night during dinner in 2010. The player controls the dialogue, selecting from one of three options, knowing that every word they say will be remembered; they can either choose to aggressively pursue their coming out to homophobic parents, lie to keep their relationship secret, or "gradually hint at it" (i.e. Nicky's bisexuality). Depending on the player's choice of dialogue several alterations to the ending may occur: e.g. Nicky's mother forces them to change schools, their father grounds them for apparently trivial remarks, and/or Nicky gets punched in the face. In all versions, the player has no control over Nicky's fate as their mother finds out about their relationship with a boyfriend and sets up a female tutor for them, ostensibly to help Nicky study but more importantly in an attempt to change their sexuality; their relationship ends three days or three weeks later.
Back in the present, Nicky outlines three different possible aftermaths to the story: the lie, in which Nicky runs away to the North Pole and finds acceptance among a new family of LGBT animals; the half-truth, in which Nicky finds that the tutor is also bisexual and befriends her, sharing their experiences as "bisexual sluts"; and the truth, which is that Case had moved to the more LGBT-friendly San Francisco Bay Area to pursue their game-developing career, distancing themself from their homophobic parents. Case remarks that in all three scenarios  "It Gets Better™", and that in the end "they won." Nicky's new lover then arrives to pick them up and carry them off the scene as the game ends.

Development
Nicky Case cites Anna Anthropy's Dys4ia, a short Flash game about gender transition, as a source of inspiration for this game. Coming Out Simulator was created in two weeks for the Nar8 Game Jam.

Events in the game are inspired by Case's own experience of coming out four years before the game's release. They wanted to revisit this dark period of their life and tried to express a similar story with deep feelings in a video game. The game is created to be played on web browsers, using JavaScript and CSS; graphics were prepared using Adobe Flash.

The game and its source code have been made public domain software by its developer with the Unlicense.

Reception
Metro Weekly describes the game as "a thoughtful, sometimes funny, often heartfelt exploration of one man's own struggle to be himself" and praises its programming.

In an interview by Complex magazine, Case indicated that they had received "a lot of really touching responses" not only from queer people but also from people living through other difficult familial situation. Coming Out Simulator 2014 was nominated to the Independent Games Festival's 2015 edition in the "Excellence in Narrative" category.

Notes

References

External links
Official Website
Coming Out Simulator's page on the Nar8 Game Jam
Developer Diary

Browser games
Open-source video games
Online games
Fiction with unreliable narrators
Art games
2014 video games
Single-player video games
Indie video games
LGBT-related video games
Public-domain software with source code
Software using the Unlicense license
Video games developed in Canada
Point-and-click adventure games